Kŭmgang County is a kun, or county, in Kangwŏn province, North Korea.  Kŭmgang lies immediately north of the Korean Demilitarized Zone.  It was formed in 1952 from a portion of Hoeyang County and from those sections of Yanggu, and Rinje counties that remained under Northern control after the armistice. The county takes its name from the Mount Kŭmgang, which is partially located there. The county seat, Kŭmgang-ŭp, was formerly called Malhwi-ri.

Geography
The Taebaek Mountains pass through the county, reaching their highest point in the Pirobong peak of Kumgangsan.  Approximately 85% of the county's area is forestland. Major local streams include the Kŭmgangch'ŏn and Tonggŭmgangch'ŏn.

Administrative divisions
Kŭmgang county is divided into 1 ŭp (town) and 26 ri (villages):

Economy
The chief local industry is agriculture, with rice and maize the dominant crops. However, arable land takes up only 8.5% of the county's area. Manufacturing and livestock raising also contribute to the local economy. Mining is supported by deposits of gold, tungsten, and quartz.

See also
Geography of North Korea
Administrative divisions of North Korea
Kangwon (North Korea)
Kumgangsan

External links

Counties of Kangwon Province (North Korea)